Events from the year 1950 in Scotland.

Incumbents 

 Secretary of State for Scotland and Keeper of the Great Seal – Arthur Woodburn until 28 February; then Hector McNeil

Law officers 
 Lord Advocate – John Thomas Wheatley
 Solicitor General for Scotland – Douglas Johnston

Judiciary 
 Lord President of the Court of Session and Lord Justice General – Lord Cooper
 Lord Justice Clerk – Lord Thomson
 Chairman of the Scottish Land Court – Lord Gibson

Events 
 14 February – First shipment of coal from Argyll Colliery (drift mining) in the reopened Machrihanish Coalfield to Belfast.
 21 February – Clydebank-built Cunard liner  arrives at the scrapyard in Faslane at the end of a 36-year career.
 August – first official Edinburgh Military Tattoo staged at Edinburgh Castle as part of the Edinburgh Festival.
 22 August – 54-year-old William "Ned" Barnie becomes the first Scot to swim the English Channel, going on to complete 3 crossings.
 8 September – 116 miners trapped underground in a landslide at Knockshinnoch Castle colliery at New Cumnock in Ayrshire.
 9 September – first miners are rescued from Knockshinnoch Castle colliery.
 11 September – rescue operation from Knockshinnoch Castle colliery is completed, with all 116 miners saved.
 18 October – the North of Scotland Hydro-Electric Board's Loch Sloy Hydro-Electric Scheme is inaugurated.
 25 December – the Stone of Scone, the traditional coronation stone of Scottish monarchs, English monarchs and more recently British monarchs, is removed from London's Westminster Abbey by a group of four Scottish students.
 St. Margaret's Hospice in Clydebank, the first modern hospice in Scotland, is begun by the Sisters of Charity.

Births 
 21 January – Seona Reid, arts administrator
 10 March – Ted McKenna, rock drummer (The Sensational Alex Harvey Band) (died 2019)
 22 March – Jocky Wilson, darts player (died 2012)
 30 March – Robbie Coltrane, actor and comedian (died 2022)
 31 March – William Blair, judge and financial lawyer
 1 May – Malcolm James Mackenzie, footballer
 6 May – Robbie McIntosh, funk drummer (Average White Band) (died 1974)
 12 May – Helena Kennedy, lawyer
 27 May – Alex Gray, crime novelist
 18 September – Jock McFadyen, painter
 29 October – James Dillon, composer
 7 November – Lindsay Duncan, actress
 3 December – Angus Glennie, Lord Glennie, judge

Deaths 
 15 January – George Livingstone, footballer (born 1876)
 26 February – Harry Lauder, entertainer (born 1870)
 17 March – Adam McKinlay, Labour politician (born 1887)
 30 March – Joe Yule, comedian and actor (born 1892)
 9 May – Charles Alexander Stevenson, lighthouse engineer (born 1855)
 10 August – James Drever, psychologist (born 1873)
 14 September – Alexander Livingstone, Liberal politician (born 1880)

See also 
 1950 in Northern Ireland

References 

 
Years of the 20th century in Scotland
Scotland
1950s in Scotland